George Foley was a British actor of the silent era.

Selected filmography
 The Battle of Waterloo (1913)
 Jobson's Luck (1913)
 The Life of Shakespeare (1914)
 The King's Romance (1914)
 The Woman Who Did (1915)
 A London Flat Mystery (1915)
 The Price He Paid (1916)
 The Answer (1916)
 Beau Brocade (1916)
 A Gamble for Love (1917)
 Drink (1917)
 The Snare (1918)
 A Sheffield Blade (1918)
 The Ticket-of-Leave Man (1918)
 Because (1918)
 The Odds Against Her (1919)
 The Grip of Iron (1920)
 Mary Latimer, Nun (1920)
 Little Dorrit (1920)
 Trent's Last Case (1920)
 Vi of Smith's Alley (1921)
 A Lowland Cinderella (1921)
 The Penniless Millionaire (1921)
 A Romance of Old Baghdad (1922)
 In the Blood (1923)
 A Couple of Down and Outs (1923)
 Love and Hate (1924)
 A Romance of Mayfair (1925)
 Stranger than Fiction (1930)

References

External links
 

Year of birth unknown
Year of death unknown
English male film actors
English male silent film actors
20th-century English male actors